The Yekaterinodarsky otdel was a Cossack district (otdel) of the Kuban oblast of the Caucasus Viceroyalty of the Russian Empire. It bordered the Kavkazsky otdel to the north, the Tamansky otdel to the west, the Black Sea Governorate to the south, and the Maykopsky otdel to the east. The area of the Yekaterinodar otdel mostly corresponded to the contemporary Krasnodar Krai region of Russia. The district was eponymously named for its administrative center, Yekaterinodar (present-day Krasnodar).

Administrative divisions 
The subcounties (uchastoks) of the Yekaterinodarsky otdel in 1912 were as follows:

Demographics

Russian Empire Census 
The majority of the population indicated Ukrainian to be their mother tongue, with significant Russian and Circassian speaking minorities.

Kavkazskiy kalendar 

Notes

References

Bibliography 

Otdels of Kuban Oblast
Kuban Oblast
Caucasus Viceroyalty (1801–1917)
History of Kuban